Andrés Carrasco Carrillo (born 4 March 1978) is a Spanish football manager, currently in charge of the Dinamo Tbilisi Academy.

Career
Born in Sant Miquel d'Olèrdola, Olèrdola, Barcelona, Catalonia, Carrasco worked for 11 years at FC Barcelona's La Masia, managing the under-9, under-12 and under-14 squads. In June 2011, he moved abroad and joined Georgia's FC Dinamo Tbilisi as a director of the youth categories.

Carrasco returned to his home nation in 2012, taking over Málaga CF's Cadete A squad and leading the side to two accolades. On 15 July 2013, he returned to Georgia after being appointed director of the youth setup at FC Saburtalo Tbilisi.

On 24 November 2014, Carrasco was named assistant manager of Álex García (whom he worked with at Dinamo Tbilisi) at CE Sabadell FC. He left the club the following February, as the manager resigned, and joined Western Sydney Wanderers FC on 14 July 2015.

Carrasco re-signed for the Wanderers in January 2016, remaining at the club until February 2017 after accepting an offer from Kardemir Karabükspor. On 6 July 2018, he switched teams and countries again after being appointed manager of FC Shakhtar Donetsk's under-19 squad. He managed the latter side in the 2019–20 UEFA Youth League, being knocked out in the group stage.

On 10 November 2020, one month after being named manager of the under-19 team, Carrasco was named manager of the Kuwait national team as well as the Kuwait U19 team.

References

External links

1978 births
Living people
People from Alt Penedès
Sportspeople from the Province of Barcelona
Spanish football managers
FC Barcelona non-playing staff
Málaga CF non-playing staff
FC Shakhtar Donetsk non-playing staff
Kuwait national football team managers
Spanish expatriate football managers
Spanish expatriate sportspeople in Georgia (country)
Spanish expatriate sportspeople in Australia
Spanish expatriate sportspeople in Turkey
Spanish expatriate sportspeople in Ukraine
Spanish expatriate sportspeople in Kuwait
Expatriate football managers in Ukraine
Expatriate football managers in Kuwait
Expatriate football managers in Georgia (country)